Carlos Andrés Arias Pérez (born 4 September 1986) is a Chilean former football goalkeeper.

Club career
A product of Universidad Católica youth system, he was sent on loan to Curicó Unido in 2006 and professionally debuted in the Primera B Championship.

International career
He was the starting goalkeeper on the Chilean U-20 team during the 2007 South American Youth Championship in Colombia, in which Chile placed fourth and subsequently qualified for the 2005 FIFA World Youth Championship.

Arias was the starting goalkeeper for Chile at the 2005 FIFA World Youth Championship in the Netherlands.

Honours

Player
Universidad Católica
 Primera División de Chile (1): Runner-up 2007 Apertura

References

External links
 

1986 births
Living people
Chilean footballers
Chile under-20 international footballers
Association football goalkeepers
Club Deportivo Universidad Católica footballers
Curicó Unido footballers
Provincial Osorno footballers
Deportes La Serena footballers
Deportes Melipilla footballers
San Antonio Unido footballers
Chilean Primera División players
Primera B de Chile players
Segunda División Profesional de Chile players